Zermatt railway station is a metre gauge railway station serving the car-free mountaineering and ski resort of Zermatt, in the Canton of Valais, Switzerland. It is the southern terminus of the BVZ Zermatt-Bahn (BVZ), which connects Zermatt with standard gauge lines at Visp (served by SBB-CFF-FFS) and Brig (served by SBB-CFF-FFS and BLS AG). Since , the BVZ has been owned and operated by the Matterhorn Gotthard Bahn (MGB), following a merger between the BVZ and the Furka Oberalp Bahn (FO). The station is across the street from Zermatt GGB railway station, the valley terminus of the Gornergrat Railway.

Overview
Every day, several Glacier Express trains, which are operated at this point by the MGB, either originate from, or terminate at, Zermatt station. The MGB also operates regional services to Brig at hourly intervals.

Additionally, due to Zermatt's car-free status, the MGB has a frequent special shuttle train service between Zermatt and nearby Täsch, where people travelling to and from Zermatt by combustion-engined vehicles are required to park their machines. For the better part of most days, this service operates at 20-minute intervals; it takes 12 minutes.

Services
The following services stop at Zermatt:

 Regio:

Gallery

See also

Glacier Express
Matterhorn Gotthard Bahn
BVZ Zermatt-Bahn
Riffelalptram
Zermatt
Matterhorn

References

Notes

Further reading

External links

 Matterhorn Gotthard Bahn

Matterhorn Gotthard Bahn stations
Railway stations in the canton of Valais
Transport in Zermatt
Railway stations in Switzerland opened in 1891